Wisniewskiioplitis is a genus of mites in the family Oplitidae.

References

Mesostigmata
Articles created by Qbugbot